Peggy Sloane was an American television soap opera script writer for more than 23 years, until 1999.

Positions held
Hocus Focus (TV series)
 Cowriter (1979-1980)

All My Children
 Associate Head Writer (1987–1989, 1997–1998)

Another World
 Head Writer (1992–1994)
 Associate Head Writer (1990–1992)

As the World Turns
 Script Writer (1998–1999)

Capitol
 Script Writer (entire run, 1982–1987)

Guiding Light
 Associate Head Writer (1994–1995)

One Life to Live
 Associate Head Writer (1995–1996)
 Co-Head Writer (1996–1997)

Awards and nominations
Daytime Emmy Awards

WINS
(1988 & 1998; Best Writing; All My Children)

NOMINATIONS 
(1994; Best Writing; Another World)
(2000; Best Writing; As the World Turns)

Writers Guild of America Award

WINS
(1999 season; All My Children)

NOMINATIONS 
(1984 season; Capitol)
(1990 & 1998 seasons; All My Children)
(1994 & 1995 seasons; Another World)
(1996 season; Guiding Light)

Head writing tenure

External links

American soap opera writers
American women television writers
Daytime Emmy Award winners
Writers Guild of America Award winners
Year of birth missing
Place of birth missing
Possibly living people
Women soap opera writers
20th-century screenwriters
21st-century American women